Baruch Hashem L'Olam may refer to the following prayers:

Baruch Hashem L'Olam (Shacharit), recited during Pesukei Dezimra
Baruch Hashem L'Olam (Maariv), recited on weekdays during the blessings of the Shema